Mei Tung Estate is a public housing estate located at the south of Wong Tai Sin, Kowloon, Hong Kong opposite Kowloon Walled City Park. It consists of 2 Old Slab-typed blocks, each building is 8-storey, providing over 600 flats. Although the estate is near Kowloon City, it belongs to Wong Tai Sin District rather than Kowloon City District because it is located at the north of Tung Tau Tsuen Road, the boundary between two districts. A third block opened in 2010, and a fourth opened in 2014.

Background
In 1971, the British Hong Kong Government cleared Tung Wo Village and Chiu Ping New Village in Tung Tau Squatter Area. In 1974, one block of the estate, "Block 6", was constructed. The government planned to demolish nearby Sai Tau Village in Kowloon City to construct remaining blocks, but the plan was strongly opposed by the village residents. As a result, the plan was left aside. (Sai Tau Village was finally demolished in 1984 to build the current Carpenter Road Park.) Since no other blocks were built, "Block 6" was renamed as "Mei Tung House" in 1979. In 1981, the government decided to construct one more block on the left side of Mei Tung House. In 1983, the block, "Mei Po House", was completed.

Houses

Demographics
According to the 2016 by-census, Mei Tung Estate had a population of 6,067. The median age was 41.4 and the majority of residents (98 per cent) were of Chinese ethnicity. The average household size was 2.5 people. The median monthly household income of all households (i.e. including both economically active and inactive households) was HK$17,000.

Politics
Mei Tung Estate is located in Tung Mei constituency of the Wong Tai Sin District Council. It was formerly represented by Sze Tak-loy, who was elected in the 2019 elections until July 2021.

Education
Mei Tung Estate is in Primary One Admission (POA) School Net 41. Within the school net are multiple aided schools (operated independently but funded with government money) and Kowloon Tong Government Primary School.

See also

Public housing estates in Wong Tai Sin

References

Public housing estates in Hong Kong
Wong Tai Sin
Nga Chin Wai
Residential buildings completed in 1974
Residential buildings completed in 1983